The 2012–13 season was Perth Glory's 8th season since the inception of the A-League and 16th since the club's founding, in 1996. It was their third season with Ian Ferguson as head coach (he was replaced by Alistair Edwards in February 2013).

Home Stadia

Due to redevelopment reducing the capacity to 9500, the 2012/2013 A-League season saw the club reclaim Patersons Stadium (formerly Subiaco Oval) as a home stadium in addition to their traditional home at nib Stadium. Perth Glory had not competed at Patersons Stadium since the 2003–04 National Soccer League (NSL) Preliminary Final, where they defeated Adelaide United by five goals.  Perth Glory began their campaign against Brisbane Roar at Patersons Stadium, a rematch of the 2012 A-League Grand Final.

First-team squad

 (On loan from Cerezo Osaka)

Trialists
  Tyson Holmes

Contract extensions

Transfers

In

Out

Competitions

Overall

A-League

Preseason

Results by round

Results summary

Results

Finals series

League table

National Youth League

Regular season

League table

Results summary

League Goalscorers by round

W-League

Regular season

Finals series

Results summary

League table

League goalscorers by round

Squad statistics

Appearances and goals

|-
|colspan="14"|Players who appeared for Perth Glory no longer at the club:

|-
|}

Goal scorers

Disciplinary record

References

2012–13
2012–13 A-League season by team